Givanildo Santana do Nascimento (born November 20th, 1971) is a retired Brazilian professional mixed martial artist, who last fought in Bellator's Middleweight division. Santana also competed in the promotions ShoXC and M-1 Global.  He is a decorated jiu-jitsu competitor, both gi and no-gi, and has won numerous titles including the Pan American Championship and the No-Gi World Championship.

Brazilian Jiu-Jitsu
Giva Santana has been training Brazilian jiu-jitsu for 25 years and is a fourth degree black belt under Lotus Club from São Paulo, Brazil. Santana has conquered numerous prestigious titles in Brazilian Jiu Jitsu including the Pan American Championship, World No Gi Championship, Masters World Championship, and the World Cup Championship (among others).  He was awarded his black belt from Master Moises Muradi on January 23, 1999.

Team Oyama / One Jiu-Jitsu
Santana was the head jiu jitsu trainer for Team Oyama where he has trained Rob Emerson, Jared Rollins, Bao Quach, and  Ian McCall.  He now runs his own jiu jitsu academy, One Jiu Jitsu and Fitness, located in Tustin, CA.

Mixed martial arts career
Santana received the nickname "Arm Collector" because 13 out of his 18 wins are by armbar (10 of them wins in a row). He has participated in ShoXC: Elite Challenger Series.

Tachi Palace Fights
Santana was scheduled to face Ultimate Fighting Championship veteran David Loiseau at Tachi Palace Fights 10 for the Tachi Palace Fights Middleweight Championship. Loiseau pulled out of the fight due to an undisclosed injury requiring surgery, so Santana instead faced former WEC champion Doug Marshall in a middleweight non-title bout which he won by submission in the first round.

Bellator MMA
In 2011 Santana has signed with Bellator Fighting Championships.  In his debut, Santana fought Darryl Cobb at Bellator 53 and won via submission in the first round.

Santana faced Bruno Santos in the quarterfinal match of Bellator season six middleweight tournament on March 16, 2012 at Bellator 61. He lost via unanimous decision.

Santana faced Brendan Sequin on November 30, 2012 at Bellator 82. Santana won via submission in the second round.

Santana faced Jason Butcher on September 7, 2013 at Bellator 98 in the quarterfinal match of Bellator Season Nine Middleweight Tournament. After dominating the first round, he was stopped for the first time in his career by TKO in the second round. Following the loss, Santana announced his retirement from MMA.

Mixed martial arts record

|-
| Loss
| align=center| 18–3
| Jason Butcher
| TKO (punches)
| Bellator 98
| 
| align=center| 2
| align=center| 1:12
| Uncasville, Connecticut, United States
| 
|-
|  Win
| align=center| 18–2
| Brendan Sequin
| Submission (kneebar)
| Bellator 82
| 
| align=center| 2
| align=center| 2:33
| Mt. Pleasant, Michigan, United States
| 
|-
|  Loss
| align=center| 17–2
| Bruno Santos
| Decision (unanimous)
| Bellator 61
| 
| align=center| 3
| align=center| 5:00
| Bossier City, Louisiana, United States
| Bellator Season 6 Middleweight Tournament Quarterfinal
|-
| Win
| align=center| 17–1
| Darryl Cobb
| Submission (armbar)
| Bellator 53
| 
| align=center| 1
| align=center| 2:00
| Miami, Oklahoma United States
| Bellator debut
|-
| Win
| align=center| 16–1
| Doug Marshall
| Technical submission (rear-naked choke) 
| TPF 10: Let The Chips Fall
| 
| align=center| 1
| align=center| 0:29
| Lemoore, California, United States
| 
|-
| Win
| align=center| 15–1
| Anthony Ruiz
| Submission (armbar) 
| MEZ Sports: Pandemonium 3  
|  
| align=center| 2
| align=center| 4:37
| Los Angeles, California, United States
| 
|-
| Win
| align=center| 14–1
| Lodune Sincaid
| TKO (punches) 
| Collision in the Cage 
|  
| align=center| 3
| align=center| 4:27
| Irvine, California, United States
| 
|-
| Win
| align=center| 13–1
| Radmir Gabdullin
| Submission (triangle choke) 
| M-1 Challenge 17: Korea
|  
| align=center| 1
| align=center| 3:47
| Seoul, South Korea
| 
|-
| Win
| align=center| 12–1
| Min Suk Heo
| Submission (armbar) 
| M-1 Challenge 14: Japan
|  
| align=center| 1
| align=center| 4:05
| Tokyo, Japan
| 
|-
| Loss
| align=center| 11–1
| Jaime Jara
| Decision (split) 
| ShoXC: Elite Challenger Series 
|  
| align=center| 3
| align=center| 5:00
| Santa Ynez, California, United States
| 
|-
| Win
| align=center| 11–0
| Matt Lucas
| Submission (armbar) 
| ShoXC: Elite Challenger Series
| 
| align=center| 1
| align=center| 1:49
| Friant, California, United States
| 
|-
| Win
| align=center| 10–0
| Jaime Fletcher
| Submission (armbar) 
| ShoXC: Elite Challenger Series
|  
| align=center| 1
| align=center| 2:46
| Santa Ynez, California, United States
| 
|-
| Win
| align=center| 9–0
| Aram Ghukasyan
| Submission (armbar) 
| Independent Event 
|  
| align=center| 1
| align=center| 1:45
| Highland, California, United States
| 
|-
| Win
| align=center| 8–0
| Chris Ledwidge
| Submission (armbar) 
| Battle in the Ballroom 1 
|  
| align=center| 1
| align=center| 0:51
| Orange County, California, United States
| 
|-
| Win
| align=center| 7–0
| Michele Verginelli
| Submission (armbar) 
| Fury FC 2: Final Combat 
|  
| align=center| 1
| align=center| 4:20
| São Paulo, Brazil
| 
|-
| Win
| align=center| 6–0
| Boris Jonstomp
| Submission (armbar) 
| Fury FC 1: Warlords Unleashed 
|  
| align=center| 1
| align=center| 2:00
| São Paulo, Brazil
| 
|-
| Win
| align=center| 5–0
| Mavrick Harvey
| Submission (armbar) 
| Invincible: Fist of Fury 
|  
| align=center| 1
| align=center| 2:00
| Ontario, California, United States
| 
|-
| Win
| align=center| 4–0
| Jun Soo Lim
| Submission (armbar) 
| WXF: X-Impact World Championships 
|  
| align=center| 1
| align=center| 2:34
| Korea
| 
|-
| Win
| align=center| 3–0
| Edwin Aguilar
| Submission (armbar) 
| WXF: X-Impact World Championships 
|  
| align=center| 1
| align=center| 2:11
| Korea
| 
|-
| Win
| align=center| 2–0
| Zamirbek Syrgabayev
| Submission (armbar) 
| WXF: X-Impact World Championships 
|  
| align=center| 1
| align=center| 2:54
| Korea
| 
|-
| Win
| align=center| 1–0
| Noriki Miyashita
| Decision (unanimous) 
| WXF: X-Impact World Championships 
|  
| align=center| 1
| align=center| 5:00
| Korea
|

References

External links
Official website
Video MMA de Giva Santana

Living people
Brazilian male mixed martial artists
Middleweight mixed martial artists
Mixed martial artists utilizing Brazilian jiu-jitsu
Brazilian practitioners of Brazilian jiu-jitsu
People awarded a black belt in Brazilian jiu-jitsu
1971 births
Sportspeople from São Paulo